Exeter is a cathedral city and the county town of Devon, South West England.

In Roman Britain, Exeter was established as the base of Legio II Augusta under the personal command of Vespasian. Exeter became a religious centre in the Middle Ages. Exeter Cathedral, founded in the mid 11th century, became Anglican in the 16th-century English Reformation. Exeter became an affluent centre for the wool trade, although by the First World War the city was in decline. After the Second World War, much of the city centre was rebuilt and is now a centre for education, business and tourism in Devon and Cornwall. It is home to two of the constituent campuses of the University of Exeter: Streatham and St Luke's.

The administrative area of Exeter has the status of a non-metropolitan district under the administration of the County Council. It is the county town of Devon and home to the headquarters of Devon County Council. A plan to grant the city unitary authority status was scrapped by the 2010 coalition government.

Name
The modern name of Exeter is a development of the Old English Escanceaster, from the anglicised form of the river now known as the Exe and the Old English suffix  (as in Dorchester and Gloucester), used to mark important fortresses or fortified towns. (The Welsh name for the city, similarly means "caer or fortress on the Exe".) The name "Exe" is a separate development of the Brittonic name—meaning "water" or, more exactly, "full of fish" (cf. Welsh pysg,  "fish")—that also appears in the English Axe and Esk and the Welsh Usk.

History

Prehistory

Exeter began as settlements on a dry ridge ending in a spur overlooking a navigable river teeming with fish, with fertile land nearby. Although there have been no major prehistoric finds, these advantages suggest the site was occupied early.

Such early towns had been a feature of pre-Roman Gaul as described by Julius Caesar in his Commentaries and it is possible that they existed in Britannia as well.

The unreliable source Geoffrey of Monmouth stated that when Vespasian besieged the city in 49 AD its Celtic name was Kaerpenhuelgoit, meaning 'town on the hill under the high wood'.

Roman times

The Romans established a  'playing-card' shaped (rectangle with round corners and two short and two long sides) fort named Isca around AD 55. The fort was the southwest terminus of the Fosse Way (Route 15 of the Antonine Itinerary) and served as the base of the man Second Augustan Legion at some time led by Vespasian, later Roman Emperor, for the next 20 years before they moved to Caerleon in Wales, which was also known as Isca.

The presence of the fort built up an unplanned civilian community ( or ) of natives and the soldiers' families, mostly to the northeast of the fort. This settlement served as the tribal capital of the Dumnonii and was listed as one of their four cities by Ptolemy in his Geography (it also appeared in the 7th-century Ravenna Cosmography, where it appears as an apparently confused entry for ). When the fortress was abandoned around the year 75, its grounds were converted to civilian purposes: its very large bathhouse was demolished to make way for a forum and a basilica, and a smaller-scale bath was erected to the southeast. This area was excavated in the 1970s, but could not be maintained for public view owing to its proximity to the present-day cathedral. In January 2015, it was announced that Exeter Cathedral had launched a bid to restore the baths and open an underground centre for visitors.

Although most of the visible structure is older, the course of the Roman wall was used for Exeter's subsequent city walls. Thus about 70% of the Roman wall remains, and most of its route can be traced on foot. The Devonian Isca seems to have been most prosperous in the first half of the 4th century: more than a thousand Roman coins have been found around the city and there is evidence for copper and bronze working, a stock-yard, and markets for the livestock, crops, and pottery produced in the surrounding countryside. The dating of the coins so far discovered, however, suggests a rapid decline: virtually none have been discovered dated after the year 380.

Medieval times

Bishop Ussher identified the Cair , listed among the 28 cities of Britain by the History of the Britons, as Isca, although David Nash Ford read it as a reference to Penselwood and thought it more likely to be Lindinis (modern Ilchester). Nothing is certainly known of Exeter from the time of the Roman withdrawal from Britain around the year 410 until the seventh century. By that time, the city was held by the Saxons, who had arrived in Exeter after defeating the British Dumnonians at Peonnum in Somerset in 658. It seems likely that the Saxons maintained a quarter of the city for the Britons under their own laws around present-day Bartholomew Street, which was known as "Britayne" Street until 1637 in memory of its former occupants.

Exeter was known to the Saxons as Escanceaster. In 876, it was attacked and briefly captured by Danish Vikings. Alfred the Great drove them out the next summer. Over the next few years, he elevated Exeter to one of the four burhs in Devon, rebuilding its walls on the Roman lines. These permitted the city to fend off another attack and siege by the Danes in 893. King Athelstan again strengthened the walls around 928, and at the same time drove out the remaining Britons from the city. (It is uncertain, though, whether they had lived in the city continuously since the Roman period or returned from the countryside when Alfred strengthened its defences.) According to William of Malmesbury, they were sent beyond the River Tamar, which was fixed as the boundary of Devon. (This may, however, have served as a territorial boundary within the former kingdom of Dumnonia as well.) Other references suggest that the British simply moved to what is now the  area, not far outside Exeter's walls. The quarter vacated by the Britons was apparently adapted as "the earl's burh" and was still named Irlesberi in the 12th century. In 1001, the Danes again failed to get into the city, but they were able to plunder it in 1003 because they were let in, for unknown reasons, by the French reeve of Emma of Normandy, who had been given the city as part of her dowry on her marriage to Æthelred the Unready the previous year.

Two years after the Norman conquest of England, Exeter rebelled against King William. Gytha Thorkelsdóttir, the mother of the slain King Harold, was living in the city at the time, and William promptly marched west and initiated a siege. After 18 days, William accepted the city's honourable surrender, swearing an oath not to harm the city or increase its ancient tribute. However, William quickly arranged for the building of Rougemont Castle to strengthen Norman control over the area. Properties owned by Saxon landlords were transferred into Norman hands and, on the death of Bishop Leofric in 1072, the Norman Osbern FitzOsbern was appointed his successor.

In 1136, early in the Anarchy, Rougemont Castle was held against King Stephen by Baldwin de Redvers. Redvers submitted only after a three-month siege, not when the three wells in the castle ran dry, but only after the exhaustion of the large supplies of wine that the garrison was using for drinking, baking, cooking, and putting out fires set by the besiegers. During the siege, King Stephen built an earthen fortification at the site now known (erroneously) as Danes Castle.

The city held a weekly market for the benefit of its citizens from at least 1213, and by 1281 Exeter was the only town in the south-west to have three market days per week. There are also records of seven annual fairs, the earliest of which dates from 1130, and all of which continued until at least the early 16th century.

Prior to the expulsion of the Jews of England in 1290, Exeter was home to England's most westerly Jewish community.

During the high medieval period, both the cathedral clergy and the citizens enjoyed access to sophisticated aqueduct systems which brought pure drinking water into the city from springs in the neighbouring parish of St Sidwell's. For part of their length, these aqueducts were conveyed through a remarkable network of tunnels, or underground passages, which survive largely intact and which may still be visited today.

Exeter and Bristol hosted the first recorded Common Council in the Medieval England. The first detailed and continuous evidence of its existence and activity was founded after 1345. Formed by twelve "better and more discreet men" (in Latin: duodecim meliores), reelected each year, it was originally designed to control the abuse of the Major and of his four stewards, which respectively presided over the borough court and the provost court. The members of the Common Council come from the same elite of wealthy citizens, as did the major and the stewards and this concern introduced a second conflict of interests in the government organism of the city.

Modern times

 Tudor and Stuart eras
In 1537, the city was made a county corporate. In 1549, the city successfully withstood a month-long siege by the so-called Prayer Book rebels: Devon and Cornish folk who had been infuriated by the radical religious policies of King Edward VI. The insurgents occupied the suburbs of Exeter, burnt down two of the city gates and attempted to undermine the city walls, but were eventually forced to abandon the siege after they had been worsted in a series of bloody battles with the king's army. A number of rebels were executed in the immediate aftermath of the siege. The Livery Dole almshouses and chapel at Heavitree were founded in March 1591 and finished in 1594.

When John Hooker was appointed to the city payroll in 1561, he created the Court of Orphans as a municipal government for families broken by the premature death of their major economic source. He also was made the Common Council as the legal owner of any estate left to the orphan children of Exeter, until they have reached the age of 21 to be partially paid back. The orphan tax was used to fund the construction of the Exeter canal.

The city's motto, Semper fidelis, is traditionally held to have been suggested by Elizabeth I, in acknowledgement of the city's contribution of ships to help defeat the Spanish Armada in 1588; however its first documented use is in 1660. Schools in Exeter teach that the motto was bestowed by Charles II in 1660 at the Restoration due to Exeter's role in the English Civil War.

When in 1638 Reverend John Wheelwright was exiled from the Massachusetts Bay Colony and subsequently established a community on the banks of the Squamscott River, he named the region Exeter after its Devonian counterpart. During the American Revolution it became the capital of New Hampshire.

Exeter was secured for Parliament at the beginning of the English Civil War, and its defences very much strengthened, but in September 1643 it was captured by the Cornish Royalist Army led by Prince Maurice. Thereafter, the city remained firmly under the king's control until near the end of the war, being one of the final Royalist cities to fall into Parliamentarian hands. The surrender of Exeter was negotiated in April 1646 at Poltimore House by Thomas Fairfax. During this period, Exeter was an economically powerful city, with a strong trade of wool. This was partly due to the surrounding area which was "more fertile and better inhabited than that passed over the preceding day" according to Count Lorenzo Magalotti who visited the city when he was 26 years old. Magalotti writes of over thirty thousand people being employed in the county of Devon as part of the wool and cloth industries, merchandise that was sold to "the West Indies, Spain, France and Italy". Celia Fiennes also visited Exeter during this period, in the early 18th century. She remarked on the "vast trade" and "incredible quantity" in Exeter, recording that "it turns the most money in a week of anything in England", between £10,000 and £15,000.

 Georgian and Victorian eras

Early in the Industrial Revolution, Exeter's industry developed on the basis of locally available agricultural products and, since the city's location on a fast-flowing river gave it ready access to water power, an early industrial site developed on drained marshland to the west of the city, at Exe Island. However, when steam power replaced water in the 19th century, Exeter was too far from sources of coal (or iron) to develop further. As a result, the city declined in relative importance and was spared the rapid 19th-century development that changed many historic European cities. Extensive canal redevelopments during this period further expanded Exeter's economy, with "vessels of 15 to 16 tons burthen [bringing] up goods and merchandise from Topsham to the City Quay". In 1778 a new bridge across the Exe was opened to replace the old medieval bridge. Built at a cost of £30,000, it had three arches and was built of stone.

In 1832, cholera, which had been erupting all across Europe, reached Exeter. The only known documentation of this event was written by Dr Thomas Shapter, one of the medical doctors present during the epidemic.

The first railway to arrive in Exeter was the Bristol and Exeter Railway that opened a station at St Davids on the western edge in 1844. The South Devon Railway Company extended the line westwards to Plymouth, opening their own smaller station at St Thomas, above Cowick Street. A more central railway station, that at Queen Street, was opened by the London and South Western Railway in 1860 when it opened its alternative route to London. Butchers Lloyd Maunder moved to their present base in 1915, to gain better access to the Great Western Railway for transportation of meat products to London.

The first electricity in Exeter was provided by the Exeter Electric Light Company, which was formed at the end of the 1880s, but it was municipalised in 1896 and became the City of Exeter Electricity Company.
In 1896 £88,000 was spent constructing sewerage system which reduced the risk of infectious diseases,

The first horse-drawn trams in Exeter were introduced in 1882 with 3 lines radiating from the city's East Gate. One line went to St David's station via New North Road, the Obelisk (where the Clock Tower now stands) and St David's Hill. The second line went out along Heavitree Road to Livery Dole and the third went to Mount Pleasant along Sidwell Street. There was a depot off New North Road.

20th century

A new bridge across the Exe was opened on 29 March 1905, replacing the former Georgian bridge. Made of cast-iron and steel with a three hinged arch design, it cost £25,000 and was designed by Sir John Wolfe Barry. Also in 1905, electric trams replaced the horse trams with a new route which passed along the High Street, down Fore Street and over the new Exe Bridge. Once across the Exe the line divided, with one route along Alphington Road and another along Cowick Street. The line to St David's Station travelled along Queen Street instead of along New North Road and the line to Heavitree was extended. On 17 March 1917, a tram went out of control going down Fore Street, hit a horse-drawn wagon, then overturned on Exe Bridge; one female passenger was killed. By the 1920s there were problems with congestion caused by the trams, a need for expensive track renewal work and the slow speed of the trams in Exeter's narrow streets. After much discussion, the council decided to replace the tram service with double-decker buses and the last tram ran on 19 August 1931. The only remaining Exeter tram in service is car 19, now at the Seaton Tramway.

Exeter was bombed by the German Luftwaffe during the Second World War when a total of 18 raids between 1940 and 1942 flattened much of the city centre. Between April 1941 and April 1943, Exeter was defended from enemy bombers by the No. 307 Polish Night Fighter Squadron, nicknamed the 'Lwów Eagle Owls', who were based at Exeter Airport. The city of Lwów shared the same motto as the city of Exeter – 'Semper Fidelis' (Always faithful).

In April and May 1942, as part of the Baedeker Blitz and specifically in response to the RAF bombing of Lübeck and Rostock,  of the city were leveled by incendiary bombing. Many historic buildings in the center—particularly adjacent to High Street and Sidwell Street—were destroyed, and others, including the cathedral, were damaged. On the night of 4 May, the Polish 307 Squadron dispatched four available aircraft against forty German Junkers Ju 88 bombers, preventing four German aircraft from releasing their load of bombs on Exeter. 156 people were killed, but the squadron suffered no casualties in the process.

To commemorate the friendship that had formed between the 307 Squadron and Exeter, the squadron presented the city with a Polish flag on 15 November 1942 (the first British city to have had that honour) outside Exeter Cathedral. Since 2012, a Polish flag is raised over the city's Guildhall on 15 November; the day is now known as '307 Squadron Day' in Exeter. On 15 November 2017, a plaque in memory of the squadron was unveiled in the St James Chapel of Exeter Cathedral by the Polish Ambassador Arkady Rzegocki.

Large areas of the city centre were rebuilt in the 1950s, with little attempt to preserve or restore historic buildings. The street plan was altered in an attempt to improve traffic circulation, and former landmarks like St Lawrence, the College of the Vicars Choral, and Bedford circus disappeared. The modern architecture stands in sharp contrast to the red sandstone of buildings that survived the Blitz.

On 27 October 1960, following very heavy rain, the Exe overflowed and flooded large areas of Exeter including Exwick, St Thomas and Alphington. The water rose as high as 2 metres above ground level in places and 150 employees of the local firm Beach Bros were trapped for nine hours. 2,500 properties were flooded. Later the same year on 3 December the river levels rose again, flooding 1,200 properties. These floods led to the construction of new flood defences for Exeter. Work began in 1965, took 12 years to complete and cost £8 million. The defences included three flood relief channels, and were complemented by the construction of two new concrete bridges (built in 1969 and 1972) to replace the old Exe Bridge which had obstructed the flow of the river and made the flooding worse.

A high-profile, random murder of a child occurred in the city in 1997, which today remains one of the UK's highest-profile unsolved murders. 14-year-old Kate Bushell, a pupil at what is now West Exe School, had her throat cut by an unidentified attacker while walking her dog along Exwick Lane, Exwick, on 15 November 1997. Despite the police insisting the killer must be local and repeatedly appealing for locals to come forward with information on Crimewatch, the attacker has never been identified. Police believe Bushell's murder is possibly linked to the murder of dogwalker Lyn Bryant in Cornwall only one year later in 1998. Police have DNA evidence in the Bryant case and there remains a £10,000 reward for information in both cases.

21st century
The Princesshay shopping centre adjoining the Cathedral Close and the High Street was redeveloped between 2005 and 2007, despite some local opposition. It incorporates 123 varied residential units.

To enable people with limited mobility to enjoy the city, Exeter Community Transport Association provides manual and powered wheelchairs and scooters ('Shopmobility') for use by anyone suffering from short- or long-term mobility impairment to access the city centre shopping facilities, events and meetings with friends.

In May 2008 there was an attempted terrorist attack on the Giraffe cafe in Princesshay, but the bomber was the only one injured.

A £30 million improvement scheme for the flood defences was approved in March 2015. The plans involve the removal of check weirs and a deeper, "meandering stream" in the centre of the drainage channels to improve flow. The plans followed a study by the Environment Agency that revealed weaknesses in the current defences. A community currency for the city, the Exeter Pound, was introduced in 2015 and dissolved in 2018.

A serious fire broke out in buildings in central Exeter on 28 October 2016. The Royal Clarence Hotel, 18 Cathedral Yard and The Well House Tavern were severely damaged in the fire. In July 2017 the restoration plans were officially unveiled, with the rebuild expected to be completed in 18 months and a scheduled reopening of the hotel in 2019. 18 Cathedral Yard was repaired by November 2018, but there was a second round of bids for the work to complete repairs to The Well House, and to rebuild the Royal Clarence Hotel as a 74-bedroom hotel. However, in late 2021 it was announced that the hotel scheme was "significantly unviable", and the Royal Clarence site would be converted into twenty-three luxury apartments with the ground floor acting as a leisure and hospitality space.  The plans were officially granted permission on 11 October 2022. The work, involving the demolition and reconstruction of the remaining fabric, will last just under eighteen months and is due to begin in the summer of 2023.

On 27 February 2021 a Second World War bomb was uncovered at a construction site and more than 2,600 people were evacuated. Bomb Disposal squads used approximately 400 tons of sand to secure it. It was safely detonated at 18:12. By 1 March hundreds of people had spent a third night away from home, however, because the detonation of the  bomb had damaged nearby buildings. On 2 March Exeter City Council lifted the safety cordon to allow residents to return to their properties but said that many would be "uninhabitable at this stage". The University of Exeter said that about 300 of the 1,400 evacuated students had not yet returned.

Homelessness
Exeter has the 6th highest number of rough sleepers on a single night of all local authorities in England (as of the autumn of 2020), marking a 19% increase from 2019. In 2014, Exeter had "...the unenviable status of having the highest per capita rate of rough sleeping outside of London". During the COVID-19 pandemic, 102 people in Exeter rough sleeping, or at risk of rough sleeping were accommodated as part of the government's 'Everybody In' directive. In Exeter City Council's recent 'Rough Sleeping Delivery Plan', a total of £3,351,347 was allocated for the purpose of reducing rough sleeping for the 2020–2021 period. The government's Next Steps Accommodation Programme also provided Exeter City Council with £440,000 to help reduce the number of rough sleepers on Exeter's streets. The council has also focussed its efforts on reducing rough sleeping in the long term, with a "£3 million Capital programme bid [for] the creation of 31 units of new long term move-on accommodation with dedicated support to be delivered before 31 March 2021".

Governance

Parliamentary
Exeter is in two parliamentary constituencies, the majority of the city is in the Exeter constituency but two wards (St Loyes and Topsham) are in East Devon. Since World War II until recently, Exeter itself was relatively marginal, with its Member of Parliament usually drawn from the governing party. Nowadays the Exeter seat is increasingly becoming a Labour stronghold. The Exeter MP is Ben Bradshaw, with the Youth MP being Georgia Howell, and Simon Jupp represents East Devon. Prior to Brexit in 2020, Exeter was part of the South West England European constituency, which elected 6 MEPs.

Local Government

Exeter's city council is a district authority, and shares responsibility for local government with the Devon County Council. In May 2012 Labour became the majority party on the council. Exeter City Council's bid for the city to become a Unitary Authority was initially approved by ministers in February 2010. A judicial review was called by Devon County Council and the Court held that the Minister had acted unlawfully in granting Unitary status to Exeter at the same time, however, following the 2010 general election the new coalition government announced in May 2010 that the reorganisation would be blocked.

From Saxon times, it was in the hundred of Wonford. Exeter has had a mayor since at least 1207 and until 2002, the city was the oldest 'Right Worshipful' Mayoralty in England. As part of the Golden Jubilee of Elizabeth II Exeter was chosen to receive the title of Lord Mayor. Councillor Granville Baldwin became the first Lord Mayor of Exeter on 1 May 2002 when Letters Patent were awarded to the city during a visit by the Queen.
The Lord Mayor is elected each year from amongst the 39 Exeter city councillors and is non-political for the term of office.

Public services
Policing in Exeter is provided by the Devon and Cornwall Constabulary who have their headquarters at Middlemoor in the east of the city.

The fire service is provided by the Devon and Somerset Fire and Rescue Service, which is headquartered at Clyst St George near Exeter. It has two fire stations located at Danes Castle and Middlemoor.

The Royal Devon University Healthcare NHS Foundation Trust has a large hospital located to the south-east of the city centre. Ambulance services in Exeter are provided by South Western Ambulance Service NHS Trust. The West Trust Divisional HQ and 999 control is in Exeter which provides cover for Devon, Cornwall, Somerset and the Isles of Scilly.

Geography

The city of Exeter was established on the eastern bank of the River Exe on a ridge of land backed by a steep hill. It is at this point that the Exe, having just been joined by the River Creedy, opens onto a wide flood plain and estuary which results in quite common flooding. Historically this was the lowest bridging point of the River Exe which was tidal and navigable up to the city until the construction of weirs later in its history. This combined with the easily defensible higher ground of the ridge made the current location of the city a natural choice for settlement and trade. In George Oliver's The History of the City of Exeter, it is noted that the most likely reasons for the original settling of what would become modern Exeter was the "fertility of the surrounding countryside" and the area's "beautiful and commanding elevation [and] its rapid and navigable river".
Its woodland would also have been ideal for natural resources and hunting.

Exeter sits predominantly on sandstone and conglomerate geology, although the structure of the surrounding areas is varied.
The topography of the ridge which forms the backbone of the city includes a volcanic plug, on which the Rougemont Castle is situated. The cathedral is located on the edge of this ridge and is therefore visible for a considerable distance.

Climate

Exeter has mild wet winters, punctuated by colder spells that are usually short-lived. Summer is characterised by warm and changeable weather with hot and cooler rainy spells. Temperatures do not vary much throughout the year compared to other locations at this latitude; however, the topography of Exeter can enhance the diurnal range by a couple degrees Celsius, as spots along the sheltered valley of the River Exe such as Quayside, St Thomas and Exwick see colder nights and warmer days, the only exception to this is with foggy and frosty weather in the winter during anticyclonic activity when fog can linger all day and keep daytime temperatures suppressed. The weather station for these reading is at Exeter Airport; adding one degree Celsius to the readings from the maximum daily temperature and deducting a degree from the overnight minima broadly covers the location disparity. It is precisely because of shelter from Dartmoor that Exeter is more frost-prone than areas to the southwest, such as Plymouth. It is also drier and warmer in the summer for the same reason. The highest recorded temperature in Exeter stands at  recorded in June 1976, while the lowest recorded temperature is  recorded in December 2010.

Demographics

From the 2011 Census, the Office for National Statistics published that Exeter's district area population was 117,773; 6,697 more people than that of the last census from 2001, which indicated that Exeter had a population of 111,076. At the time of the 2011 UK census, the ethnic composition of Exeter's population was 93.1% White, with the largest minority ethnic group being Chinese at 1.7%. The White British, White Irish and other ethnic group all declined in numbers since the 2001 census (−1%, -6% and −10% respectively). Meanwhile, the Chinese and Other Asian had the largest increases (429% and 434% respectively). This excludes the two new ethnic groups added to the 2011 census of Gypsy or Irish Traveller and Arab. Below are the 10 largest immigrant groups in Exeter .

In 2011, the City of Exeter had a population of 117,773, while its inner urban subdivision had a population of 113,507. The Exeter USD (urban subdivision) does not include the town of Topsham, which while it is administratively part of the city, it is often considered a separate individual settlement as well as the fact its excluded from the city's constituency.

In 2011, 11.9% of the population of the Exeter USD were non-white British, compared with 11.7% for the actual city and surrounding borough of Exeter.

In 2009, Exeter City was 89.1% White British, compared with 88.3% in 2011.

The Exeter Urban Area had a population of 124,079 in 2014, compared with 124,328 for the city and borough of Exeter. While the Exeter Metropolitan Area had a population of 467,257 in the same year and includes Exeter along with Teignbridge, Mid Devon and East Devon. Out of all the Devon districts, Exeter receives the largest number of commuters from East Devon, followed by Teignbridge. Most of the city's ethnic minority population live in the central, northwestern and eastern suburbs of the city. Outlying areas such as Pinhoe, Cowick and the expensive suburb of Topsham are all 95% White British as of 2011.

Ethnicity 
The ethnicity of the City of Exeter from 1991 to 2021 is below:

Religion

Economy

The Met Office, the main weather forecasting organisation for the United Kingdom and one of the most significant in the world, relocated from Bracknell in Berkshire to Exeter in early 2004. It is one of the largest employers in the area (together with the University of Exeter, Devon County Council and the Royal Devon and Exeter NHS Foundation Trust).

Around 35,000 people commute into Exeter on a daily basis, from nearby surrounding towns. Exeter provides services, employment and shopping for local residents within the city limits and also from nearby towns in Teignbridge, Mid Devon and East Devon, together sometimes known as the Exeter & Heart of Devon area (EHOD). Exeter therefore provides for the EHOD area population of 457,400.

Exeter has been identified among the top ten most profitable locations for a business to be based.

The city centre provides substantial shopping facilities. The High Street is mainly devoted to branches of national chains: a NEF survey in 2005 rated Exeter as the worst example of a clone town in the UK, with only a single independent store in the city's High Street, and less diversity (in terms of different categories of shop) than any other town surveyed. In 2010, a similar survey reported the city was still the worst clone town. As of 2019, the last independent store on the high street is closed. Three significant shopping areas that connect to the High Street provide a somewhat more varied menu. Princesshay, a post-war retail area connecting to the south side of the High Street was home to a number of independent stores prior to redevelopment in 2007, but is now also largely occupied by national chains. It is still intended that a number of the new units will be let to local independent stores. The House of Fraser building on the high street has been bought by a local wealth performance management firm, Prydis, who have released their plans to redevelop the building as a three-storey hotel with a rooftop bar and retail shops.

On the other side of the High Street, the partly-undercover Guildhall Shopping Centre houses a mixture of national and more regional shops, and connects to the wholly enclosed Harlequins Centre where smaller businesses predominate. Smaller streets off the High Street such as Gandy Street also offer a range of independent shops.

On 26 June 2004, Exeter was granted Fairtrade City status.

Although Exeter contains a number of tourist attractions, the city is not dominated by tourism, with only 7% of employment dependent on tourism compared with 13% for Devon as a whole (2005 figures).

There are also plans to build on land in the Teignbridge and East Devon areas, which border Exeter's boundaries, as part of the "Exeter Growth Point" strategy.

Landmarks

Among the notable buildings in Exeter are:

Religious buildings

 The cathedral, founded in 1050 when the bishop's seat was moved from the nearby town of Crediton (birthplace of Saint Boniface) because Exeter's Roman walls offered better protection against "pirates", presumably Vikings. A statue of Richard Hooker, the 16th century Anglican theologian, who was born in Exeter, has a prominent place in the Cathedral Close.
 St Nicholas Priory in Mint Lane, the remains of a monastery, later used as a private house and now a museum owned by the city council. The priory was founded in medieval times and was home to Benedictine monks for over 400 years, until it was closed and partly demolished by Henry VIII. The remaining buildings were then sold off in 1602 and became the home of the locally wealthy Hurst family. The property has been fully renovated by Exeter City Council, and the small garden area features Tudor plants and herbs
 A number of medieval churches including St Mary Steps which has an elaborate clock.
 The Exeter Synagogue is the third oldest synagogue in Britain, completed in 1763.
 St Thomas' Church, originally built in the 13th century just outside the city walls. Destroyed by fire and rebuilt in the 17th century; grade I listed.

Secular buildings and features

 The ruins of Rougemont Castle; later parts of the castle were still in use by the Crown Court and the County Court until 2004 when the new Exeter Law Courts opened. A plaque near the surviving medieval gatehouse recalls the fate of Alice Molland, tried for witchcraft at Exeter in 1685, and reputedly the last person in England to have been executed for that crime; others convicted of witchcraft had been hanged in Exeter in 1581, 1610, and 1682.
 The Guildhall, which has medieval foundations and has been claimed to be the oldest municipal building in England still in use.
 Mol's Coffee House, a historic building in the Cathedral Close.
 Tuckers' Hall, a 15th-century guild hall for the incorporation of Weavers, Fullers and Shearmen, that is still in use today.
 The Custom House in the Quay area, which is the oldest brick building surviving in the city.
 "The House That Moved", a 14th-century Tudor building, earned its name in 1961 when it was moved from its original location on the corner of Edmund Street in order for a new road to be built in its place. Weighing more than twenty-one tonnes, it was strapped together and slowly moved a few inches at a time to its present-day position.
 Parliament Street in the city centre is one of the narrowest streets in the world.
 The Butts Ferry, an ancient cable ferry across the River Exe.
 Wyvern Barracks, a former artillery barracks, dates back to about 1800.
 Higher Barracks, a former cavalry barracks, dates back to 1794.
 The Devon County War Memorial in the Cathedral Close, designed by Sir Edwin Lutyens and unveiled in 1922 by Edward, Prince of Wales.

Many of Exeter's old buildings are made from the local dark red sandstone, which gives its name to the castle and the park that now surrounds it (Rougemont means 'red hill'). The pavements on Queen Street are composed of the rock diorite and exhibit feldspar crystals, while those around Princesshay are composed of granodiorite.

Northernhay Gardens
Located just outside the castle, Northernhay Gardens is the oldest public open space in England, being originally laid out in 1612 as a pleasure walk for Exeter residents.

Transport

Car

The M5 motorway to Bristol and Exeter starts at Birmingham, and connects at Bristol with the M4 to London and South Wales. The older A30 road provides a more direct route to London via the A303 and M3. The M5 is the modern lowest bridging point of the River Exe. Going westwards, the A38 connects Exeter to Plymouth and south east Cornwall, whilst the A30 continues via Okehampton to Cornwall and ends at Penzance. The cities of Bristol, Plymouth, Bath, Salisbury and Truro can all be reached within two hours.

Travel by car in the city is often difficult with regular jams centred on the Exe Bridges area. Historically, the bridges were a significant bottleneck for holiday traffic heading to southwest England, leading to the construction of the first bypass in the mid-1930s over Countess Wear Bridge, followed by the M5 in 1977. To further address the problem of congestion in the city centre, Devon County Council has park and ride services, and in 2006 considered the introduction of congestion charges.

Bus
Exeter's main operator of local buses is Stagecoach South West, which operates most of the services in the city. Dartline, is a minor operator in the city. Former operator Cooks Coaches were taken over by Stagecoach forming Stagecoach South West. Western Greyhound was also a main operator connecting Exeter to Cornwall until its services were taken over by First Devon & Cornwall, Plymouth Citybus and Stagecoach South West in March 2015. There is a bus station.

Railway

Exeter is the main rail hub in the South West and is linked to most branch lines in Devon, including to Paignton, Exmouth, Barnstaple and Okehampton. This makes it possible to reach most stations in Devon directly from Exeter St Davids.

Exeter is served by three main railway stations. Exeter St Davids is served by all services and is a major interchange station within the South West Peninsula's rail network, whilst Exeter Central is more convenient for the city centre but served only by local services and the main line route to London Waterloo. In the south-west of the city, Exeter St Thomas serves the western side of the city. There are also six suburban stations, Topsham, St James Park, Polsloe Bridge, Pinhoe, Digby & Sowton and Newcourt, served only by local services.

There are two main line railway routes from Exeter to London, the faster route via Taunton and Reading to London Paddington and the slower West of England Main Line via Salisbury and Basingstoke to London Waterloo. Another main line, the Cross Country Route, links Exeter with Bristol, Birmingham, Derby, Leeds, Newcastle, Edinburgh and Aberdeen. Great Western Railway and CrossCountry services continue westwards along the Exeter to Plymouth Line, variously serving Torquay, Plymouth and Cornwall. Local branch lines run to Paignton (see Riviera Line), Exmouth (see Avocet Line), Barnstaple (see Tarka Line) and Okehampton (see Dartmoor Line).

The Exeter to Plymouth line of the London and South Western Railway (LSWR) used to provide an alternative route via Okehampton connecting north Cornwall and Plymouth to Exeter and the rest of the UK railway system until its closure in 1968. There are proposals to reopen the line from Okehampton via Tavistock to Bere Alston, for a through service to Plymouth. Network Rail began repair work and the line reopened on 4 April 2014. In the wake of widespread disruption caused by damage to the mainline track at Dawlish by coastal storms in February 2014, Network Rail is considering reopening the Bere Alston to Okehampton and Exeter section of the former LSWR line as an alternative to the coastal route.

Air

Exeter Airport lies east of the city, and the local airline, previously called Jersey European and British European but later as Flybe, was a significant local employer until its collapse in 2020. It is also a base for TUI Airways with flights to Faro, Mallorca, Lanzarote and elsewhere. The airport offers a range of scheduled flights to British and Irish regional airports and charter flights. Connections to international hubs began with Paris-Charles de Gaulle in 2005 and later a daily service to Amsterdam Schiphol Airport which ended with the collapse of Flybe in 2020. Ryanair started flights in 2019 to Luqa, Naples and Málaga. Shortly adding Alicante but stopping the Naples and Luqa flights.

Canal

The Exeter Canal, also known as the Exeter Ship Canal, was first constructed by John Trew in about 1566, representing one of the oldest artificial waterways in Britain. It was cut to bypass the St James' Weir that had been built across the River Exe at Duckes Marsh to provide a leat to a mill constructed just below the confluence of the Northbrook, in what became the village of Countess Weir. The weir had the effect of preventing water-borne trade in the City of Exeter and forced boats to load and unload at Topsham from where the Earls of Devon were able to exact large tolls to transport goods to and from Exeter.

In order to maintain a consistent navigable water level, another weir was constructed by Trew, just below the point the canal joins the river. The canal was later extended south to Topsham Lock , deepened and widened, and later still it was extended to Turf Lock near Powderham . The canal was successful until the middle of the 19th century since when its use gradually declined – the last commercial use was in 1972. However it is now widely used for leisure purposes, and the city basin is part of a £24 million redevelopment scheme.

Education

The University of Exeter, which has two campuses in the city, includes the Business School, the Bill Douglas Cinema Museum, the Henry Wellcome building for Biocatalysis, and, as of September 2018, the Exeter Centre for Circular Economy.

Exeter College is a further education college. It previously operated as the sole sixth form for the entire maintained school sector in the city. However, in 2014 Exeter Mathematics School was established, a free school sixth form with a specialism in Mathematics.

For about 30 years the city of Exeter operated a maintained school system in which the divisions between phases came at different ages from most of the United Kingdom, with first, middle and high rather than infant, junior and secondary schools, so that children transferred between schools at the age of about 8 and 12 rather than 7 and 11. From 2005, however, it has adopted the more usual pattern, because of the pressures of the UK National Curriculum. The changeover back to the more typical structure led to a citywide, PFI funded, rebuilding programme for the high schools and led to the changing of names for some schools. Following the reorganisation there are 25 primary schools, four referral schools, three special schools and five secondary schools within Exeter. The secondary schools are Isca Academy (formerly Priory High School), St James School (formerly St James High School), St Luke's Church of England School (formerly Vincent Thompson High School), St Peter's Church of England Aided School (a consolidation of the former Bishop Blackall High School for Girls and Heles High School for Boys) and West Exe School (formerly St Thomas High School).

The city has a number of independent schools, including Exeter School, Exeter Cathedral School, The Maynard School and St Wilfrid's School.

There are specialist schools for pupils with sensory needs, including Exeter Royal Academy for Deaf Education, and the West of England School for the Partially Sighted.

The Atkinson Unit is a secure specialist residential and educational complex for children in care or remanded by the courts.

Religion

Numerous churches, and other religious buildings, are present in Exeter. A majority belong to differing Christian denominations, including a Church of England cathedral. The medieval city of Exeter had nearly 70 churches, chapels, monasteries and almshouses.

Exeter Cathedral is the seat of the Bishop of Exeter. The erection of the present building was completed in approximately 1400, and possesses the longest uninterrupted vaulted ceiling in England, as well as other noticeable characteristics. A collective of Anglican churches form the Exeter Deanery.

There are two Catholic Churches: the Sacred Heart and the Blessed Sacrament, with congregations reflecting the nature of older and more recent immigration.

Exeter Synagogue, located within a near proximity to Mary Arches Street, was completely erected in 1763.

Exeter's mosque and Islamic centre are located on York Road. The first mosque was opened in 1977. The purpose-built mosque opened in 2011.

At the 2001 census, 69.12% of Exeter's population stated their religion as Christian, which is mildly lower than the regional average of 73.99% and the national average of 71.74%. Despite this, all other religions had exceeded the regional average at just under 1%. Although, they were much lower than the national average with the exemption of Buddhism. 20.45% of Exeter's population stated they had no religion, which was higher than the regional average of 16.75% and the national average of 14.59%.

Anglican churches

John Betjeman (writing in 1958) selects St David's ("Caroe's best church"), St Martin's ("characteristic little city church, 15th century"), St Mary Steps ("medieval city church; font"), St Michael's ("Victorian, on a fine site"), and St Thomas's ("fittings"). His coverage of St Mary Arches is more detailed: "worth seeing ... as the completest Norman church in Devon: beautifully light and airy after its restoration from the bombing in 1942. 18th-century altar arrangements. Memorials to Exeter worthies, 16th to 18th centuries."

The aforementioned collective of Anglican churches include St David's Church, located near to St David's Station. The church was envisaged by W. D. Caroe, with the windows being manufactured by Kempe & Tower, and was later constructed between 1897 and 1900. A tower stands on the northeast side, with the overall design being described as "highly picturesque" by Nikolaus Pevsner.

St Edmund-on-the-Bridge was built on the Exe Bridge ca. 1230–40. Two arches of the bridge remain under the undercroft though the church was rebuilt in the Perpendicular style in 1835, using the old materials.

St Martin's is in the Cathedral Close; the plan is odd, and there are numerous items of church furniture, though these are not of high aesthetic value. St Mary Arches is a Norman church with aisles. St Mary Steps was originally by the West Gate of the city; the font is Norman, and there is a remarkable early clock. St Michael, Heavitree was built in 1844–46 and extended later in the century. St Pancras is of the 13th century and has a nave and chancel only; the font is Norman. The plan of St Petroc's church is highly unusual: a second chancel has been added facing north while the original chancel has another use and faces east. There are two aisles on the south, one of 1413 and another of the 16th century.

St Sidwell's church is by W. Burgess, 1812, in the Perpendicular style. St Stephen's church is partly of the 13th century but most of the structure is as rebuilt in 1826. St Michael and All Angels Church on Mount Dinham has a spire which exceeds the height of the towers of Exeter Cathedral.

Sport

Rugby union

The city's professional rugby union team is the Exeter Chiefs. Founded in 1871, as Exeter Rugby Club, the team have played their home games at Sandy Park stadium, located adjacent to junction 30 of the M5, since 2006 after relocating from their previous stadium at the County Ground which had been used continually from 1905. They have been continuous members of the highest division of English rugby, the Premiership, since 2010. They have been English champions twice, in 2017, and 2020. Anglo-Welsh Cup winners twice, in 2014 and 2018. In 2020, the club became European Champions for the first time in their history, defeating Parisian based club Racing 92 in the final at Bristol's Ashton Gate Stadium 31–27.

The city also has two other clubs: Wessex Rugby Club, which is located in Exwick, and Exeter Saracens Rugby Club, which is located in Whipton.

Football

Exeter City is Exeter's only Professional Association football club. Currently members of League One, they have played their home games at St James Park since their formation in 1904. The club were founder members of the Football League's Third Division (south) in 1920, but have never progressed higher than the third tier of the English football league system, and in 2003 were relegated to the Conference.

Other sports

Exeter Cricket Club administer three teams that play in the Devon Cricket League. The first of which plays in the Premier Division at first XI level and the next plays at second XI level. The club play their home games at County Ground where they have remained for over 180 years.

Exeter Rowing Club competes both locally and nationally, and has a recorded history originating in the early 19th century. The City of Exeter Rowing Regatta is run annually in July, and is the eldest and largest regatta in the South West, with racing first recorded on the river in the 1860s.

Exeter's speedway team, Exeter Falcons, was established in 1929 and were located at the County Ground until its permanent closure in 2005. The team was revived in 2015, but are currently based in Plymouth. Speedway was also staged briefly at tracks in Alphington and Peamore after the Second World War.

Culture

Literature

The Exeter Book, an anthology of Anglo Saxon poetry, is conserved in the vaults of Exeter Cathedral. The Exeter Book originates from the 10th century and is one of four manuscripts that between them encompass all surviving poetry composed in Old English. Predominantly, the Book incorporates shorter poems, several religious pieces, and a series of riddles, a handful of which are famously lewd. A selection of the aforementioned riddles are inscribed on a highly polished steel obelisk situated in High Street, placed there on 30 March 2005.

Another famous piece of literature is the Exon Domesday, a composite land and tax register of 1086. The piece contains a variety of administrative materials concerning the counties of Cornwall, Devon, Dorset, Somerset and Wiltshire. This piece is also conserved in Exeter Cathedral.

In 2019, the city became a UNESCO City of Literature.

Theatre

Exeter has several theatres. The Northcott Theatre is situated in the Streatham campus of the University of Exeter and is one of relatively few provincial English theatres to maintain its own repertory company. This theatre is the successor to the former Theatre Royal, Exeter which was permanently closed in 1962.

The Barnfield Theatre was originally constructed as Barnfield Hall by Exeter Literary Society towards the end of the 19th century and converted to a theatre in 1972. It is a charity and is used as a venue for amateur and professional theatrical companies.

The Cygnet Theatre in Friars Walk is the home of the Cygnet Training Theatre and is a member of the Conference of Drama Schools. As well as performances given by students in training, this theatre also stages performances from visiting repertory companies.

The Bike Shed Theatre and Cocktail Bar opened in September 2010 before permanently closing in March 2018 because it failed to generate enough profit from the cocktail bar in order to operate the theatre. Operating from basement premises in Fore Street, the theatre offered intimate live music and performances.

Additionally, more innovative and contemporary performances, theatrical productions and dance pieces are programmed by Exeter Phoenix in Exeter City Centre and The Exeter Corn Exchange in Market Street.

Music
The largest orchestra based in Exeter is the EMG Symphony Orchestra.

Chris Martin, lead singer of internationally famous band Coldplay, grew up in a Grade II-listed Georgian house set in eight acres of grounds in the nearby village of Whitestone.

Museums and galleries
 The Royal Albert Memorial Museum in Queen Street is Exeter's predominant museum. The museum maintains its own collections of regional, national and international importance. Recently, the museum underwent an extensive refurbishment. It reopened on 14 December 2011, and was subsequently awarded the National Art Fund Prize – UK Museum of the Year 2012. The Museum also runs St Nicholas Priory in Mint Lane, near Fore Street.
 Additionally, the University of Exeter has an extensive fine art collection and an assortment of exhibition spaces across its Streatham campus. Showing a vibrant programme of exhibitions, performances, films and visual arts. The sculpture collection contains works by artists including Barbara Hepworth, Peter Thursby, Geoffrey Clark and Elaine M. Goodwin. It can be located using the Sculpture Trail.
 Exeter Phoenix is one of South West England's leading contemporary arts venues. The venue occupies the former university site in Gandy Street and programmes international, national and outstanding regional artists.
 Until its closure in 2017, Spacex (art gallery), was a contemporary arts organisation, that programmed exhibitions of contemporary art and promoted artist-led projects, events and research.

Newspapers
 Express and Echo, published weekly on Thursdays.
 Exeter Flying Post, published weekly. Originally discontinued in 1917, but was revived in 1976 as an alternative community magazine. The last issue was in 2012.
 The Western Morning News, a Plymouth printed daily regional paper.
 Exeposé, the university's student newspaper, printed fortnightly.

Radio
BBC Radio Devon broadcasts to Exeter locally on FM (95.8) and AM (990 AM/MW), although the majority of programming originates in Plymouth. In the evenings, BBC Radio Devon joins the South West Regional service. Heart West formerly Gemini FM and DevonAir, broadcasts on 97.0 FM, with East Devon and Torbay utilising their own frequencies. Both Heart West and BBC Radio Devon broadcast from the St Thomas transmitter. AM radio is broadcast from Pearce's Hill located at J31 of the M5.

Other radio stations include Radio Exe, an easy listening station broadcasting on 107.3 FM, Phonic.FM which provides a "no adverts no playlist" alternative on 106.8 FM or online at www.phonic.fm, VI, a station broadcasting from the West of England School and College on 1386 AM/MW.

Additionally, Exeter University has a well established student station, Xpression FM, which broadcasts on 87.7 FM using two low-powered transmitters, although it can be heard over much of the north of the city.

The local commercial radio station is Radio Exe. The local community radio station is Phonic FM.

Television
Both BBC Spotlight and ITV West Country provide Exeter with regional news outputs. BBC Spotlight is broadcast from Plymouth and ITV Westcountry is broadcast from Bristol, although both services do have newsrooms in Exeter. The St Thomas and Stockland Hill transmitting station both provide the city's coverage with both transmitters having completed the digital switchover.

Twin towns

Exeter is twinned with Rennes in France, Bad Homburg in Germany, and Terracina in Italy.

Freedom of the City

The following people and military units have received the Freedom of the City of Exeter.

Individuals
 Admiral Rt Hon Lord Nelson : 15 January 1801.
 Gareth Steenson: 7 October 2021.
 Richard Jacobs: 1 December 2021.
 Philip Bostock: 18 July 2022.

Military units
 The Royal Marines: April 1977
 243 (The Wessex) Field Hospital (V): July 2002
 The Rifles (formerly The Devonshire and Dorset Regiment): June 2007  
 The Coldstream Guards: July 2011
 RAF Brize Norton: 21 October 2013.
 , RN: March 2014

Notable people
See List of people from Exeter and :Category:People from Exeter

See also

 Exeter (HM Prison)
 Henry Phillpotts

References

Sources and further reading

External links

 Exeter City Council
 History of Exeter  from White's Devonshire Directory, 1850
 
 

 
Roman fortifications in Devon
Cities in South West England
Towns in Devon
County towns in England
Non-metropolitan districts of Devon
Staple ports
Roman legionary fortresses in England
Unparished areas in Devon
Boroughs in England